Dawson Farm, also known as "Rocky Glen," is a historic property with two homes located at Rockville, Montgomery County, Maryland.  The property contains two dwellings: the 1874, -story, frame Dawson Farmhouse and a large -story hip-roofed frame house dating to 1912.

It was listed on the National Register of Historic Places in 1985.

References

External links
, including photo in 1975, at Maryland Historical Trust website

Houses completed in 1874
Houses completed in 1912
Houses in Montgomery County, Maryland
Houses on the National Register of Historic Places in Maryland
Buildings and structures in Rockville, Maryland
1874 establishments in Maryland
National Register of Historic Places in Montgomery County, Maryland